The canton of Charleville-Mézières-2 is an administrative division of the Ardennes department, northern France. It was created at the French canton reorganisation which came into effect in March 2015. Its seat is in Charleville-Mézières.

It consists of the following communes:

Arreux
Charleville-Mézières (partly)
Damouzy
Houldizy
Nouzonville
Sécheval

References

Cantons of Ardennes (department)